Monte Stello (or Monte Stellu) is a mountain in the department of Haute-Corse on the island of Corsica, France.
It is the second highest point in the Monte Stello massif, which forms the backbone of Cap Corse.

Location

The peak is roughly at the intersection of the borders of the communes of Olcani to the northwest, Olmeta-di-Capocorso to the west and Brando to the east.
It is east of the village of Olmeta-di-Capocorso and west of the village of Erbalunga on the east coast.

Physical

Monte Stello consists of Cretaceous ophiolites that were formed during the Alpine orogeny.

Hiking

It is long and takes about six and a half hours to complete, but is well-marked and not technically demanding.
It runs through maquis shrubland.
From the summit there is an excellent panorama of the north of Corsica.

Gallery

Notes

Sources

Mountains of Haute-Corse